Esmerine is a Canadian modern chamber music group that incorporates genres such as post rock, drone music, post punk, and Turkish folk. Founded in Montreal in 2000 by Bruce Cawdron (drums) and Beckie Foon (cello), current members also include percussionist Jamie Thompson and multi-instrumentalist Brian Sanderson. The band has released six albums. Dalmak, was awarded Instrumental Album of the Year at the Juno Awards of 2014. Their 2015 album Lost Voices is nominated for Instrumental Album of the Year at the Juno Awards of 2016.

History

2000-02: Founding
The chamber rock group Esmerine was formed in 2000, and was initially a duo consisting of percussionist Bruce Cawdron and cellist Beckie Foon. The two had recently met in Montreal while both were recording the debut album of Canadian post-rock band Set Fire To Flames. Cawdron and Foon had independently contributed to other Montreal-based groups as well, notably Godspeed You! Black Emperor, Thee Silver Mt. Zion Memorial Orchestra & Tra-La-La Band, Saltland, Fifths of Seven and Mile-End Ladies' String Auxiliary. However, instead of using the guitar-focused sound of their other projects, the duo initially focused on percussion and cello, drawing on minimalist classical music and chamber music. The band initially performed their original music in gigs around Montreal.

2003-10: Early releases

Esmerine recorded and released their debut album If Only a Sweet Surrender to the Nights to Come Be True in May 2003. It came out on the UK label Resonant Records, as well as the band's newly formed Madrona Records imprint. The album met with a largely positive reception. Allmusic gave it 4/5 stars, stating, "A French female name meaning quiet and sensitive, Esmerine is a fitting moniker for the overall sound," and calling it "a sublime chamber rock album that brings Rachel's or Wim Mertens to mind." While Allmusic described the later tracks as having rock influences, "The three opening tracks are serene, melancholic, and well-composed, avoiding the quiet-loud-quiet or builds-to-crescendo device."

In 2004 the duo recorded their second album at the Hotel2Tango studio in Montreal. They released Aurora in May 2005 on Madrona Records, with a vinyl version released by Ninja Tune. In the mid-2000s Foon dedicated more time to Thee Silver Mt. Zion, while Cawdron continued to work as an acupuncturist. At the same time they continued to occasionally perform in Montreal, often bringing in guest artists or collaborating with other groups.

2011: La Lechuza
Foon and Cawdron began writing new music together in earnest in 2010. For their third album, La Lechuza, two new members joined the group: Sarah Pagé, a harp player, and multi-instrumentalist Andrew Barr (both of The Barr Brothers and the Lhasa de Sela band).  Album producer Patrick Watson also contributed vocals on two songs, with other guests including violinist Sarah Neufeld (Arcade Fire) and saxophonist Colin Stetson. Mark Lawson of Arcade Fire mixed most of the tracks. As part of La Lechuza, Esmerine collaborated with Patrick Watson to honor their recently deceased friend Lhasa de Sela, creating the dedication website Snow Day for Lhasa. It was listed as one of the top ten underground records of the year in Mojo.

2012-14: Dalmak
Recording process
After Barr and Page became occupied with their other projects, Esmerine added two new members to their touring lineup: percussionist Jamie Thompson and multi-instrumentalist Brian Sanderson.

After a number of live performances the quartet began writing new material in early 2012. After performing in Istanbul, the band was invited to return for an artist residency later that year. After turning a rented loft into a makeshift recording studio, the band recorded for two days in Istanbul. According to the band, "We immersed ourselves in the culture of the city of Istanbul and the people whom we met there." Among the guest musicians were Hakan Vreskala, Baran Aşık, Ali Kazim Akdağ and James Hakan Dedeoğlu.

The album, Dalmak, was completed in the winter of 2012 and 2013, at Breakglass Studios in Montreal with engineer Jace Lasek. The word 'dalmak' means immerse in Turkish. It can also be interpreted as "to dive into," "to contemplate," and "to be absorbed in."

Reception
Dalmak was released on Constellation Records in 2013. It was awarded Instrumental Album of the Year at the Juno Awards of 2014. Tiny Mix Tapes gave Dalmak a score of 3/5. The review described the album as starting off with the band's normal style, before Turkish influences start to dominate in tracks such as "Lost River Blues II." The Line of Best Fit gave it 7.5/10 stars, saying the members "spin a fine web of noise – it’s fragile, tempestuous, pensive and sprawling – as they experiment with languid strains of clinical harmony, exploring avant-garde themes in neo-classical music, electronica and post-rock." The review further stated, "they ultimately craft gorgeous, sparkling experimental noises that blur the line between post-rock, minimalist electronica and Turkish folk."

2015: Lost Voices
Lost Voices was released on Constellation Records in 2015. It is nominated Instrumental Album of the Year at the upcoming Juno Awards of 2016. The band composed the record at Le Chateau Monthelon in Montreal. France. Lost Voices is the result of multiple recording sessions led by Vid Cousins (Kid Koala, Amon Tobin, Colin Stetson) and was mixed/produced by Jace Lasek (The Besnard Lakes) at his Breakglass Studio in Montréal.  Expanding from Dalmak's core quartet, Esmerine also welcomes bassist Jeremi Roy (who began touring with the group in 2013) as an official member. Lost Voices is also notable for the appearance of GY!BE/Silver Mt. Zion violinist Sophie Trudeau as a featured guest.

Style, live performances
Decoder Magazine has described Esmerine as "new-classical, punk-drone-post rock." As a "chamber rock" ensemble, Esmerine's music consists mainly of percussion, cello, and marimba, lacking the guitars prominent in the members' other side projects. Esmerine's style shares many characteristics with minimalist classical music and chamber music.

When the band tours live they are known to use lightbox projections by artist and puppeteer Clea Minaker, also known for working with Feist. In December 2013, the band toured Europe and the UK, with several Turkish musicians joining them on stage.

Members
Current

 Bruce Cawdron (2000–present) - marimba, drums, melodic percussion
 Beckie Foon (2000–present) - cello
 Jamie Thompson (2011–present) - drums, percussion
 Brian Sanderson (2011–present) - multiple instruments

Past
 Sarah Pagé (2010-2011) - harp 
 Andrew Barr (2010-2011)- multiple instruments

Awards

Discography

Studio albums

Singles

References

External links

 Esmerine Official Website
 Esmerine on Facebook
 Esmerine at Constellation Records
 Madrona Records

Musical groups established in 2003
Musical groups from Montreal
Canadian post-rock groups
Juno Award for Instrumental Album of the Year winners
2003 establishments in Quebec